Roger-Claude Guignard (born 5 February 1935 - died 28 August 2022) is a sailor from Switzerland, who represented his country at the 1980 Summer Olympics in Tallinn as crew member in the Soling. With helmsman Jean-François Corminboeuf and fellow crew member Robert Perret they took the 7th place.

References

1935 births
2022 deaths
Sailors at the 1980 Summer Olympics – Soling
Olympic sailors of Switzerland
Swiss male sailors (sport)